Mannsville may refer to:

Mannsville, Kentucky, United States
Mannsville, New York, United States
Mannsville, Oklahoma, United States